Carlos Enrique Watson Simes (born November 22, 1951) is a Costa Rican former footballer and most recently manager of Deportivo Saprissa.

Playing career
Watson played for his hometown team Limón and was then transferred to Herediano, where he won three national titles during the 70s.

Managerial career
His career as a coach is much more notable, as he has been the coach for Costa Rica's three most important teams, Deportivo Saprissa, Herediano and Alajuelense. With Saprissa he won the CONCACAF Champions Cup in 1993 and with Alajuelense he won two national championships, in 1983 and 1984.

Watson is known in his country more as an excellent coach for minor leagues than everything else. For instance, as General Manager for Saprissa's minor leagues in the mid-1990s, he discovered an excellent generation of players that are still playing football in Costa Rica, some as internationals. He then took over the job as coach for Costa Rica's U-20 national team, with whom he went on to participate in two Football World Youth Championships. The first one was held at Nigeria in 1999 and the second one in Argentina in 2001, taking the team to the second round in both tournaments. From those teams, Costa Rican players such Gilberto Martínez, Winston Parks, José Luis López Ramírez, Pablo Brenes, Michael Umaña, Carlos Hernández  among others, made their first appearances as internationals.

In 2007, Watson stood down at Herediano to act as a football consultant. In September 2012, he took over at Uruguay de Coronado replacing Randall Chacón. He resigned from his post in November 2014.

Personal life
Watson is married to Adilia Muñoz Murillo and they have a son and a daughter. He is an uncle of one of Costa Rica's most famous football players, Paulo Wanchope.

References

External links
Interview with Carlos Watson Simes

1951 births
Living people
People from Limón Province
Costa Rican footballers
C.S. Herediano footballers
Costa Rican football managers
L.D. Alajuelense managers
Deportivo Saprissa managers
C.S. Herediano managers
Association football midfielders